Pangot is a village in the Kosiyakutoli tehsil of Nainital district in Uttarakhand, India, and a tourist destination at a height of 6,510 feet.

Tourism 

Pangot Village is located about 13 kilometers from Nainital, which is a popular hill station. The drive to here passes through the forested area of Naina Peak Range via Himalaya Darshan & Echo Zone which are famous for Himalaya view of Nanda Devi series and Kilbury, which are birding spots.

The main attraction of Pangot are its birds; around 580 bird species have been recorded in this area. One can see a variety of Himalayan species along the way such as lammergeier, Himalayan griffon, blue-winged minla, spotted & slaty-backed forktail, rufous-bellied woodpecker, rufous-bellied niltava, khalij pheasant, variety of thrushes etc. Almost 150 bird species have been recorded at Pangot and the surrounding areas. The numerous perennial & seasonal creeks are home to a variety of flora and fauna including leopards, yellow-throated Himalayan martens, Himalayan palm civets, gorals, barking deer and sambhar.

Roughly in Summers (March–July) temperatures can range from 25 °C in Morning/Noon to 12 °C at Night. In Winters (December–January) temperatures range from 18 °C in Morning/Noon to 8 °C at Night. Carrying a light jacket & a sweater is recommended.

Things To Do 
Birding, Adventure Activities (Rappelling, Burma Bridge, Flying Fox, Double Rope and more), Waterfall Trek, Trek to China/Naina Peak, Trek to Brhamsthali, Kilbury Trek, Village Walk, Sunset Point Trek

References 

Villages in Nainital district
Tourism in Uttarakhand